Sir Robert Rich, 2nd Baronet (c. 1648 – 1 October 1699) was an English Whig politician.

Rich was the second son of Nathaniel Rich of Stondon and his wife Elizabeth Hampden, married his distant cousin, Mary Rich, and inherited her father's baronetcy by special remainder. By Mary, he had four sons and several daughters. His sons were Charles, Robert, Nathaniel, and Cholmondeley, of whom the first two inherited his baronetcy in succession. 

Rich was a Whig Member of Parliament for Dunwich and a Lord of the Admiralty during the reign of William III. He was active in speaking on naval affairs in the House. 

On 5 May 1692, he was appointed Vice-Admiral of Suffolk, an office he held until a few days before his death, when he was replaced by his eldest son Charles.

References

1699 deaths
Baronets in the Baronetage of England
Lords of the Admiralty
Year of birth uncertain
Robert
1648 births
Whig (British political party) MPs
English MPs 1689–1690
English MPs 1690–1695
English MPs 1698–1700
1640s births